Gu Wenxiang (born 8 February 1991) is a Chinese footballer who plays as midfielder for Chinese club Lijiang Yuanheng.

Club career
In 2008, Gu Wenxiang started his professional footballer career with  Sheffield United in the Hong Kong First Division League. He transferred to Chinese Super League club Jiangsu Sainty in February 2015. On 22 March 2015, Gu made his debut for Jiangsu in the 2015 Chinese Super League against Shandong Luneng Taishan, coming on as a substitute for Yang Hao in the 52nd minute.

Gu signed for China League Two side Meizhou Meixian Techand in July 2017. On 27 February 2018, Gu transferred to Chinese Super League club Henan Jianye.
On 2 March 2019, Gu transferred to China League Two side Kunshan F.C.

Career statistics 
Statistics accurate as of match played 31 December 2020.

Honours

Club
Jiangsu Sainty
Chinese FA Cup: 2015

References

External links
 

1991 births
Living people
Chinese footballers
Footballers from Yunnan
Yunnan Flying Tigers F.C. players
Jiangsu F.C. players
Henan Songshan Longmen F.C. players
Kunshan F.C. players
Chinese Super League players
China League One players
China League Two players
Hong Kong First Division League players
Association football midfielders